Forever is a 1994 Philippine romantic drama film directed by Rowell Santiago. The film stars Aga Muhlach and Mikee Cojuangco, the latter on her theatrical debut.

Plot
Isabel (Mikee) runs away from her family upon knowing she will be forced to marry Albert (Tonton), the family's business associate whom she does not love. She moves to Manila and works as a waitress under her new identity. There, she meets and falls in love with Chito (Aga), a happy-go-lucky person.

Cast
 Aga Muhlach as Chito
 Mikee Cojuangco as Isabel
 Pilar Pilapil as Purita
 Dante Rivero as Iking
 Tonton Gutierrez as Albert
 Tommy Abuel as Gusting
 Bing Loyzaga as Beth
 Marjorie Barretto as Vivian
 Angelu De Leon as Cindy
 Rosemarie Gil as Mrs. Campos
 Johnny Wilson as Mr. Campos
 Kate Gomez as Cindy's Friend
 Dexter Doria as Mrs. Tagle
 Evelyn Vargas as Evelyn
 Jinky Oda as Charity
 Rolando Tinio as Mr. Malicsi
 Lucy Quinto as Manang Joyce
 Tyrone Sason as Brix
 Edwin Bayani as Bayani
 DJ Durano as Jason
 Archi Adamos as Detective
 Boyet Mercado as Mang Ben
 Zorayda Sanchez as Facial Girl

Original soundtrack
The film's official soundtrack "Forever", was originally sung by the Filipino band, Passage. It was also covered by Martin Nievera and Regine Velasquez but their version is not included in the official soundtrack.

References

External links

1994 films
1990s Tagalog-language films
1994 romantic drama films
Viva Films films
Philippine romantic drama films